Greys Peak is the northernmost summit of the East Humboldt Range of Elko County in northeastern Nevada about  southwest of the community of Wells. To the west are Dennis Flats, Starr Valley, and remote Greys Lake, while to the east are Chimney Rock, Clover Valley, and popular Angel Lake. The summit is the start of a high crest running almost  to the south.

The peak is named after Enoch Grey, an early homesteader in nearby Starr Valley.

Climbing
The most common approach starts at the Angel Lake Campground on the mountains western flank.

References

External links 
 

East Humboldt Range
Mountains of Nevada
Mountains of Elko County, Nevada